Naga Airport (Filipino: Paliparan ng Naga, Bikol: Palayugan nin Naga)  is an airport serving the city and metropolitan area of Naga (including the provincial capital Pili), located in the province of Camarines Sur in the Philippines. Although the airport is named after Naga, it is actually located in the provincial capital, Pili. The airport is classified as a Class 1 principal (major domestic) airport by the Civil Aviation Authority of the Philippines, a body of the Department of Transportation (DOTr) that is responsible for the operations of not only this airport but also of all other airports in the Philippines except the major international airports.

In 2019, the DOTr announced that they intended to make the airport capable of handling flights at night by 2021. As of March 2022, the airport is considered to be night-rated by the CAAP.

Airlines and destinations

Accidents and incidents 

 On December 15, 1993, a Philippine Air Force C-130H Hercules crashed on Mt. Manase, in Barangay Tanag, Libmanan, Camarines Sur, as it was approaching Naga Airport. The plane was on a typhoon relief mission. The total fatalities were 30, including 6 crewmembers.
 On June 24, 1996, an Air Philippines NAMC YS-11 aircraft struck a ground power unit while taxiing at Naga Airport (WNP). The aircraft caught fire. There were no fatalities among the 34 aircraft occupants.
 On August 18, 2012, a Piper Seneca carrying the Department of Local Interior and Government Secretary, Jesse Robredo, crashed while attempting to make an emergency landing at the Moises R. Espinosa Airport in Masbate City. The aircraft was en route from Mactan–Cebu International Airport to Naga when it encountered an engine failure. Three persons were killed, including Secretary Robredo.

See also
List of airports in the Philippines

References

External links
 

Airports in the Philippines
Transportation in Camarines Sur
Buildings and structures in Camarines Sur